Rumjatar Airport  is a domestic airport located in Rumjatar  serving Okhaldhunga District, a district in Province No. 1 in Nepal.

Facilities

Airlines and destinations

References

External links

Airports in Nepal
Buildings and structures in Okhaldhunga District